Crombrugghia is a genus of moths in the family Pterophoridae. It was erected by James William Tutt in 1906.

Species
Crombrugghia distans (Zeller, 1847)
Crombrugghia kollari (Stainton, 1851)
Crombrugghia laetus (Zeller, 1847)
Crombrugghia reichli Arenberger, 1998
Crombrugghia tristis (Zeller, 1839)

Selected former species
Crombrugghia wahlbergi

References

Oxyptilini
Moth genera
Taxa named by J. W. Tutt